Freaky Friday is a 1976 American fantasy-comedy film directed by Gary Nelson, with the screenplay written by Mary Rodgers based on her 1972 novel of the same name. The film stars Barbara Harris and Jodie Foster in the lead roles. John Astin, Patsy Kelly, Dick Van Patten, Sorrell Booke and Charlene Tilton are featured in supporting roles. In the film, a mother and her daughter switch their bodies, and they get a taste of each other's lives. The cause of the switch is left unexplained in this film, but occurs on Friday the 13th, when Ellen and Annabel, in different places, say about each other at the same time, "I wish I could switch places with her for just one day". Rodgers added a water skiing subplot to her screenplay.

Freaky Friday was released theatrically in the United States on January 21, 1977, by Buena Vista Distribution. The film received positive reviews from critics with praise for Foster and Harris's performances and was a box office success, grossing $36 million on a $5 million budget. At the 34th Golden Globe Awards, it received three nominations: Best Actress – Comedy or Musical (for both Foster and Harris), and Best Original Song ("I'd Like to Be You for a Day"). The successes of the film's released, launched a franchise thereafter.

Plot
Ellen Andrews (Barbara Harris) and her daughter, Annabel (Jodie Foster) constantly quarrel. Following a disagreement on Thursday, before Friday the 13th, Annabel leaves to join a friend at a local diner. In sync, Annabel and Ellen (who is in the family home's kitchen) both wish aloud, "I wish I could switch places with her for just one day". Their wish comes true when their bodies are switched. After a brief scene where they are shocked at seeing their new appearances, both ladies proceed as each other normally would.

Annabel is now a housewife, tending to laundry, car repair, grocery deliveries, carpet cleaners, dry cleaners, her housemaid, and the family Basset hound, Max. As though Annabel did not have her hands full, Bill Andrews (John Astin) coerces her to cook dinner for twenty-five people as his catered dinner party plans fell through. Annabel enlists Boris (Marc McClure), a neighbor on whom she has harbored a crush, to look after her younger brother and help make a chocolate mousse but all three manage to mess everything up, then later saving face by making everything into a smörgåsbord. Annabel does have a bright spot with her brother, Ben, such as getting to have personal discussions with him, when she picks him up from school. He tells her which qualities he envies about Annabel, and is able to share her loathing over the housemaid, who is constantly complaining about Annabel's sloppiness, and then confesses when he tried to be messy to connect with Annabel, the housemaid said he didn't know better and cleaned up after him. Plus, between all the talks, they play baseball, which improves their relationship. Annabel later has remorse for misjudging Ben, and gets a different outlook on him.

Meanwhile Ellen, now a high school student, struggles with marching band, destroys her entire typing class's electric typewriters, exposes her photography class's developing film, and loses a field hockey game. However, Ellen does have one bright point, in a U.S. history class where she accurately recounts the Korean War, having lived through the 1950s as a little girl. In an effort to escape school, Ellen (as Annabel) runs to Bill's office. There, she encounters Bill's new attractive, young, and immodestly dressed secretary. Ellen attempts to intimidate the young woman by sharing how frightening "her mother" is. This effort appeared successful as the secretary adopts more modest clothing, glasses, and an unflattering hairstyle. Ellen (as Annabel) asks Bill for access to his credit card in order to make herself over as her braces were scheduled to be removed that afternoon. Bill approves and chalks up his secretary's awkward appearance to personal problems at home as her son is sick and her husband was wounded in the Vietnam War, causing Ellen to scold herself for not trusting her husband.

The day ends in a comical twist when the mother-daughter pair wishing a new request: to return to themselves. This does happen, although in a different manner than before. They are physically transferred, with Annabel suddenly sitting now behind the wheel of a car with Ben and Boris, with none of them knowing how to drive and attracting the attention of several squad cars. Ellen in turn finds herself water skiing as she (as Annabel) was scheduled to participate in an aquacade. Bill, who has prospective clients at the aquacade, fears unemployment as he sees Ellen flailing helplessly on skis, but her antics amuse the clients so much that Bill wins the account.

With a new understanding of each other's lives, mother and daughter forgive each other. Following the events of Freaky Friday, Annabel begins dating Boris. Bill is playing cards with Ellen, still trying to understand what happened. Ellen and Bill are fine with Boris taking Annabel to a pizzeria for a date, and Annabel surprises Ben by letting him tag along with them. Ben complains that he never gets to do fun stuff like his dad, who is getting ready for a business trip the following Saturday dirt biking with a Japanese motorcycle firm looking to enter the U.S. market, while Bill says Ben should be more appreciative of a worry-free childhood. Ben remarks he would love to spend one Saturday in his dad's shoes, while Bill says the same about Ben, causing Annabel and Ellen to get nervous and suggest that Bill and Ben do not want to switch places, but they simultaneously and indignantly say "Oh, yes, I do!", much to Ellen and Annabel's chagrin.

Cast

Production

Neither Barbara Harris nor Jodie Foster did any actual water skiing in the film. In both cases, these scenes were achieved with the use of professional water skiers in long shot on location, and cutaway shots of the actresses in front of a rear projection effect. However, Foster did play field hockey in the film. Parts of the film were shot in Mission Bay, San Diego.

Reception
 

Richard Eder of The New York Times wrote: "Toward the end there are some amusing car-chase scenes. Elsewhere the humor is clotted by the feeling that the jokes are chasing the reactions, instead of the other way around". Variety wrote that "a promising concept" had been "bungled by a talky, repetitive screenplay and overbroad direction". Roger Ebert gave the film 2.5 stars out of 4 and wrote: "The problems resulting from the switch of identities are fairly predictable, but fun: This is one of the better recent Disney productions". Gene Siskel also gave the film 2.5 stars out of 4 and stated that the two leads "do a serviceable job with mediocre material". Kevin Thomas of the Los Angeles Times thought that the movie "has the stuff of a stronger, more sophisticated film but has been processed to fit into the bland, synthetic Disney formula. Even so, both Miss Harris and Miss Foster make the most of their offbeat opportunity". Gary Arnold of The Washington Post wrote that the film "suffers from sluggish exposition, mediocre direction and a one-closeup-after-another method of composition advertising the film's eventual retirement to the Disney TV series, but it probably salvages things with juvenile audiences by finishing fast".

Awards and nominations

Remakes
Freaky Friday has had three different remakes, all produced by the Walt Disney Company: 

 a made-for-television film in 1995 starring Shelley Long and Gaby Hoffmann
 a live-action theatrical release in 2003 starring Jamie Lee Curtis and Lindsay Lohan
 a musical version for television starring Cozi Zuehlsdorff and Heidi Blickenstaff in 2018

Notes

References

External links 
 
 
 
 
 

1976 films
1970s children's comedy films
1970s fantasy comedy films
American children's comedy films
American fantasy comedy films
1970s English-language films
Films about wish fulfillment
Films based on American novels
Films directed by Gary Nelson
Films produced by Ron W. Miller
Films scored by Johnny Mandel
Freaky Friday
Films about mother–daughter relationships
Walt Disney Pictures films
1976 comedy films
Field hockey films
1970s American films
Films shot in San Diego
Body swapping in films